Oleksa Mykolajovych Hirnyk (Oleksa Mykolajovyč Hirnyk; 28 March 1912 – 21 January 1978) was a Ukrainian Soviet dissident, an engineer by profession, who burned himself to death as an act of protest against Soviet suppression of the Ukrainian language (russification), culture and history. The act was quickly covered up by the Soviet authorities and remained unknown to general populace for decades. He was convicted of treason by the Polish Republic and then by the Soviet Union.

Background 
Hirnyk was born on 28 March 1912 in the town of Bohorodchany, then Austria-ruled Galicia, currently in Ivano-Frankivsk Oblast (province) in western Ukraine. He came from a family of boykos with a long background of preserving Ukrainian culture and heritage, his grandfather was the founder of the Prosvita Society in Bohorodchany, a society that promoted Ukrainian culture and the Ukrainian language.

After finishing secondary education, his parents wanted him to study at the seminary to become a priest. He, however, enrolled into a paramilitary organization "Sokil". When he was getting ready to study philosophy at the University of Lviv, he was conscripted into the Polish army. While serving, he protested the treatment of Ukrainian soldiers by the Polish officers. Because of statements against the Polish government and speaking about the independence of Ukraine, he was sentenced to five years in prison. When the Soviets took control of Ukraine in 1939, Hirnyk escaped from prison in Lviv. In that same year he persisted with his promotion of the Ukrainian language and of Ukrainian culture, and he did not hide his aspirations for independent Ukrainian statehood.  He was arrested and sentenced to 8 years, which he spent in a penal colony in the Ural region. After he was released in 1948 he returned to Ukraine, married Carolyna Petrash and worked in different jobs. Soon he became conscious of the dire state of the Ukrainian language in the country and witnessed that, due to the Soviet policies of Russification, Ukrainian language was no longer spoken, particularly in the eastern and central regions. In his house he began to produce handwritten leaflets (accompanied with quotes of Taras Shevchenko) — overall 1000 copies in 8 different versions.

Protest 
The night of 21 January 1978, the eve of the sixtieth anniversary of Ukraine's declaration of independence by the Tsentralna Rada government, Hirnyk doused himself with four liters of gasoline and burned himself to death on Chernecha Hill, in Kaniv not far from Taras Shevchenko’s tomb.  He had written close to a thousand leaflets containing quotes of Taras Shevchenko, protests against the russification of Ukraine, and calls for Ukrainian independence, and left them scattered on the hill. The KGB and local police quickly collected about 950 of them, however a few were hidden by the locals and even by some policemen. The man who discovered the body was arrested and coerced into silence. Hirnyk's wife was initially told that her husband died in a car accident and she was later forced to sign a written statement pledging not to tell anyone about the particulars of her husband's death. Hirnyk's son was 23 years old at the time of his father's death.

Commemoration 
Unlike the Czech student Jan Palach, who also burned himself to death in protest of Soviet occupation of Czechoslovakia, Hirnyk's sacrifice was not well known. However for years on the anniversary of his death, unknown people were putting on the place of his death a cluster of red guelder-rose fruits as a tribute. After Ukraine's independence, Hirnyk's story began to emerge from the archives and testimonies of the witnesses. In 1993 a street was named after him in Kalush, and a memorial plaque was put on his house. In 1999 the Hirnyk charitable fund was set up dedicated to the promotion of children's literature in Ukrainian. In 2000 a guelder-rose bush was planted on the place of his death. By decree of the President of Ukraine of 18 January 2007, Oleksa Hirnyk was awarded the title of the Hero of Ukraine posthumously and awarded the Order of the State.

See also 
 List of political self-immolations
 Vasyl Makukh
 Jan Palach
 Jan Zajíc
 Ryszard Siwiec
 Romas Kalanta
 Liviu Babeș

References 

 Mariya Hantsyak, "Oleksa Hirnyk burned himself in protest against Russification of Ukraine, Welcome to Ukraine, 2007/1
 М. Іщенко.  Спалився за Україну : Художньо-біографічна повість. Київ: Просвіта, 2004. 
 Museum of Dissident Movement

1912 births
1978 suicides
People from Ivano-Frankivsk Oblast
People from the Kingdom of Galicia and Lodomeria
Ukrainian Austro-Hungarians
Self-immolations in protest of the Eastern Bloc
Ukrainian dissidents
Suicides in the Soviet Union
Suicides in Ukraine
Recipients of the title of Hero of Ukraine
Soviet dissidents
Gulag detainees
Inmates of Bereza Kartuska Prison
Anti-Russification activists
1978 deaths